Conrad is an unincorporated community in Calhoun County, Illinois, United States. Conrad is southwest of Brussels. Hetzer Cemetery is located in the community.

History

A post office called Conrad opened up in the community in 1880 and shut down in 1903. At the time of the post office's opening, Conrad had a river landing called Martin's Landing. It was owned by the postmaster of the Conrad post office, John Martins.

References

A New Geography Of Calhoun County

Unincorporated communities in Calhoun County, Illinois
Unincorporated communities in Illinois